Siarhei Hrybanau is a paralympic athlete from Belarus competing mainly in category F12 shot put and discus events.

Siarhei competed in the shot and discus in both the 2004 and 2008 Summer Paralympics winning a bronze medal in the F13 discus in the 2004 games.

References

Paralympic athletes of Belarus
Athletes (track and field) at the 2004 Summer Paralympics
Athletes (track and field) at the 2008 Summer Paralympics
Paralympic bronze medalists for Belarus
Living people
Medalists at the 2004 Summer Paralympics
Year of birth missing (living people)
Paralympic medalists in athletics (track and field)
Belarusian male discus throwers
Belarusian male shot putters
Visually impaired discus throwers
Visually impaired shot putters
Paralympic discus throwers
Paralympic shot putters
Belarusian people with disabilities
Blind people